The Greater Depression is a play on the term Great Depression, possibly referring to:

Economics
The COVID-19 recession of 2020, which in the future may exceed the depth of Great Depression

Culture
Dark Conspiracy, role-playing game
Wide Awake (novel), speculative fiction novel by David Levithan